Walt Disney World Quest: Magical Racing Tour, sometimes mislabeled as Disney MT Racing or Walt Disney World: Magical Racing Quest, is a 2000 go-kart racing video game based on attractions at the Walt Disney World Resort. Players compete in races on tracks inspired by attractions such as the Haunted Mansion, Pirates of the Caribbean, Space Mountain and Big Thunder Mountain Railroad to acquire missing parts for the park's fireworks machine, which was accidentally destroyed by Chip 'n' Dale while they were gathering acorns. The game was developed by Crystal Dynamics and published by Eidos Interactive. The Game Boy Color version was developed by Prolific Publishing.

Gameplay
The game consists of normal kart racing gameplay, racing in three-lap races around tracks inspired by Big Thunder Mountain Railroad, Blizzard Beach, Dinosaur, Rock 'n' Roller Coaster, the Haunted Mansion, the Jungle Cruise, Tomorrowland Speedway, Space Mountain, and Pirates of the Caribbean to win parts for the fireworks machine in the game's story mode. Completing the story will also unlock a track inspired by Splash Mountain. However, on tracks inspired by Test Track, Typhoon Lagoon, and Hollywood Studios, players must collect thirty coins around the driving areas of these tracks within four minutes in order to complete their events.

With the exceptions of Chip, Dale (both of whom appear in their Rescue Rangers outfits), and Jiminy Cricket, the game's playable characters are original characters made for the game.

Music
The soundtrack features authentic Disney music from the attractions, with the exception of Space Mountain, which features music from the Disneyland version, Rock 'n' Roller Coaster, which does not feature Aerosmith as the actual attraction does, and Dinosaur and Blizzard Beach, which each use tracks from Gex: Enter the Gecko and Gex 3: Deep Cover Gecko, both of which Hedges previously composed (while using an adapted rendition of a track from the latter game). The menu screen features an instrumental version of “It’s a Small World”.

Reception

The Dreamcast version received "mixed" reviews according to the review aggregation website Metacritic.

Reviewers of IGN and Eurogamer praised the presentation of the PlayStation (IGN) and Dreamcast versions (Eurogamer), and how the developers were able to recreate popular attractions in-game, and the "Disney-esque" charm it has. Both also berated the difficulty (with the CPU racers being so hard to beat), some of the graphics, and the fact that the developers only used a small sound sample from each attraction and looped it, which got annoying quickly.

A reviewer of GameSpot called the Dreamcast version a good entry to the kart racing genre, while also bringing attention to its many similarities to Mario Kart. The amount of detail put into the tracks and the sound were also praised, but the reviewer was disappointed by the game's short play length. Greg Orlando of NextGen said of the same console version: "Video game behemoth Eidos has fallen prey to the notion that wacky characters plus karts plus odd power-ups automatically equals good racing fun. It doesn't". Nintendo Power gave the Game Boy Color version a mixed review, nearly three months before its U.S. release date.

See also
List of Disney video games

References

External links
 
 

2000 video games
Chip 'n Dale Rescue Rangers
Crystal Dynamics games
Disney video games
Dreamcast games
Eidos Interactive games
Game Boy Color games
Kart racing video games
Multiplayer and single-player video games
Pirates of the Caribbean video games
PlayStation (console) games
Racing video games set in the United States
The Haunted Mansion video games
Video games based on Walt Disney Parks and Resorts attractions
Video games developed in the United States
Video games scored by Burke Trieschmann
Video games set in Orlando, Florida
Windows games
Video games set in amusement parks